The 2013 Bendigo Women's International (1) was a professional tennis tournament played on outdoor hard courts. It was the fifth edition of the tournament which was part of the 2013 ITF Women's Circuit, offering a total of $50,000 in prize money. It took place in Bendigo, Australia, on 21–27 October 2013.

WTA entrants

Seeds 

 1 Rankings as of 14 October 2013

Other entrants 
The following players received wildcards into the singles main draw:
  Naiktha Bains
  Pamela Boyanov
  Isabella Holland
  Ashley Keir

The following players received entry from the qualifying draw:
  Emma Hayman
  Ema Mikulčić
  Ayaka Okuno
  Karolina Wlodarczak

Champions

Singles 

  Casey Dellacqua def.  Noppawan Lertcheewakarn 6–4, 6–4

Doubles 

  Erika Sema /  Yurika Sema def.  Monique Adamczak /  Olivia Rogowska 3–6, 6–2, [11–9]

External links 
 2013 Bendigo Women's International (1) at ITFtennis.com
 Tennis Australia official website

2013 ITF Women's Circuit
2013 in Australian tennis
Bendigo Women's International
2013 in Australian women's sport